Tortured Souls was a magazine published by Beast Enterprises Limited in Oxford, UK and then in Birmingham.

Contents
Tortured Souls was a British magazine consisting of adventures for roleplaying games.

Publication history
The first issue appeared in October–November 1983. The last issue was 12 which was published in 1988.

Reception
Doug Cowie reviewed Tortured Souls for Imagine magazine, and stated that "Tortured Souls represents amazing value. The quantity of material for the money makes it a recommended purchase. The quality of that material makes it an essential purchase."

Aaron Allston reviewed Tortured Souls in The Space Gamer No. 73. Allston commented that "If you are a fantasy GM, I'd wholeheartedly recommend Tortured Souls to you. It's pretty good."

References

Defunct magazines published in the United Kingdom
Magazines established in 1983
Magazines disestablished in 1988
Mass media in Birmingham, West Midlands
Mass media in Oxford
Role-playing game magazines